The Clarkson Golden Knights represented Clarkson University in ECAC women's ice hockey during the 2019–20 NCAA Division I women's ice hockey season. Qualifying for the 2020 NCAA National Collegiate Women's Ice Hockey Tournament, the event was cancelled due to the COVID-19 pandemic.

Offseason

Recruiting

Regular season

Standings

Schedule
Source: 

|-
!colspan=12 style="  "| Regular Season
|-

Roster

2019-20 Golden Knights
Current as of 2019–20 season

Awards and honors
Gabrielle David, ECAC Hockey Rookie of the Week (Clarkson) (awarded October 21, 2019) 
Elizabeth Giguere, 2019-20 ECAC Hockey Player of the Year
Elizabeth Giguere, 2019-20 ECAC Hockey Best Forward
Elizabeth Giguere, 2019-20 CCM/AHCA Hockey First Team All-American
Elizabeth Giguere, 2019-20 Patty Kazmaier Award

ECAC Hockey All-Stars
Elizabeth Giguere, 2019-20 ECAC Hockey First Team All-League 
Ella Shelton, 2019-20 ECAC Hockey First Team All-League

References

Union
Clarkson Golden Knights women's ice hockey seasons